Jeffery Neill MacKay (October 20, 1948 – August 22, 2008) was an American character actor. MacKay was born in Dallas, Texas.

Career 

MacKay played Gordie Masterson, one of the shrunken protagonists, on the fantasy adventure series Dr. Shrinker, a segment of the Saturday morning children's TV show The Krofft Supershow.

He may be best remembered as Magnum's friend Mac on Magnum, P.I.,  but he was also featured in recurring roles in Baa Baa Black Sheep, as First Lieutenant Donald "Don" French, JAG, Battlestar Galactica, Airwolf, The Greatest American Hero and Tales of the Gold Monkey. He also voiced Fireflight in Transformers.

Personal
His cousin is Robert Redford.

Death
MacKay died of liver failure on August 22, 2008 in Tulsa, Oklahoma, aged 59.

Partial filmography
Hot Summer in Barefoot County (1974) – Culley Joe
Axe (1974) – Radio and Television Shows (voice)
The Brass Ring (1975) – Teddy
All the President's Men (1976) – Reporter
Baa Baa Black Sheep (1976–1978, TV series) – 1st Lt. Donald French
Tales of the Gold Monkey (1982–1983, TV Series) – Corky
Airwolf (1984) – Sgt. Willie Nash - S1.E11 "To Snare a Wolf"
Songwriter (1984) – Hogan
Airwolf (1984) – Buddy - S2.E1 "Sweet Britches"
Magnum, P.I. (1980–1988, TV Series) – Lieutenant McReynolds / Jim 'Mac' Bonnick / Ski / TV News Reporter (voice, uncredited)
Frame Up (1991) – Bob Sprague
Frame-Up II: The Cover-Up (1992) – Deputy Bob Sprague
JAG (1995–2005, TV Series) – Master Chief Petty Officer 'Big Bud' Roberts, Sr., USN
December (2010) – Larry Carter (final film role)

References

External links
 

1948 births
2008 deaths
Male actors from Dallas
American male film actors
American male television actors
American male voice actors
Deaths from liver failure
20th-century American male actors